Eprosartan is an angiotensin II receptor antagonist used for the treatment of high blood pressure. It is marketed in the United States as Teveten by Abbvie, the spin-off of the pharmaceutical discovery division of Abbott Laboratories; it is marketed as Eprozar by Intas Pharmaceuticals in India, and by Abbott Laboratories elsewhere. The compound came into the Abbott Laboratories cardiovascular pipeline with its acquisition of Kos Pharmaceuticals in 2006, which had licensed it, along with "a range of hypertensive treatments", from the Biovail Corporation. 

Eprosartan is sometimes paired with hydrochlorothiazide, whereupon it is marketed in the US as Teveten HCT and elsewhere as Teveten Plus.

The drug acts on the renin–angiotensin system to decrease total peripheral resistance in two ways. First, it blocks the binding of angiotensin II to AT1 receptors in vascular smooth muscle, causing vascular dilatation. Second, it inhibits sympathetic norepinephrine production, further reducing blood pressure.

As with other angiotensin II receptor antagonists, eprosartan is generally better tolerated than enalapril (an ACE inhibitor), especially among the elderly.

Structure activity Relationship 
One feature that compares in Eprosartan versus other molecules is that Eprosartan is dosed relatively high at 400 to 800 mg/day. Eprosartan has an alpha-beta unsaturated hydrocarbon group which makes the compound difficult to absorb and contributes to its instability, thus there is a need for higher doses. The lipophilic aspects of the molecule also contribute to its low bioavailibility.

See also 
 Discovery and development of angiotensin receptor blockers

References

External links 
 
 

Angiotensin II receptor antagonists
Imidazoles
Thiophenes
AbbVie brands
Benzoic acids